Pantadenia is a genus of plants under the family Euphorbiaceae first described as a genus in 1925. It is native to Madagascar and Indochina.

Species
 Pantadenia adenanthera Gagnep. - Cambodia, Laos, Thailand, Vietnam
 Pantadenia chauvetiae (Leandri & Capuron) G.L.Webster - Madagascar
 Pantadenia gervaisii R.Rabev. & McPherson - Madagascar

References

Euphorbiaceae genera